Jalagash (Jalağaş) is an urban-type settlement and the administrative center of Jalagash District in Kyzylorda Region of Kazakhstan.

References

Populated places in Kyzylorda Region